Alejandro "Álex" Gálvez Jimena (born 6 June 1989) is a Spanish professional footballer. Mainly a central defender, he can also play as a defensive midfielder.

Career

Early career
Born in Granada, Andalusia, Gálvez played youth football for Albacete Balompié and Villarreal CF. He was loaned by the latter to farm team CD Onda in Tercera División, in what was his senior debut.

In the following two seasons, Gálvez played in Segunda División B with CF Villanovense and Sporting de Gijón's reserves, being relegated on both occasions but reinstated in 2010–11.

Sporting Gijón
On 13 December 2011, Gálvez made his debut with Sporting's main squad in a Copa del Rey match against RCD Mallorca (1–0 away win, 2–1 aggregate loss). The following 15 January, again as a starter and a stopper, he made his first La Liga appearance for the Asturians, scoring the first goal of the game in an eventual 2–1 home victory over Málaga CF.

Rayo Vallecano
Gálvez agreed to terms with Rayo Vallecano on 18 July 2012, on a two-year deal. He scored his first official goal for his new team on 20 October 2013, from a 30-metre free kick for the match's only at UD Almería.

In late May 2013, the Madrid outskirts club rejected a €2 million offer from Borussia Dortmund for Gálvez's playing rights.

Werder Bremen
On 13 May 2014, after consecutively helping Rayo retain their top-flight status, free agent Gálvez signed a three-year contract with SV Werder Bremen in Germany. For most of the first half of his first season he was deployed in defensive midfield by coach Robin Dutt, but under the former's successor Viktor Skrypnyk he became a constant in the centre of defence, until injuries limited him to five appearances from January to May 2015.

Continuing injury problems over the summer break proved detrimental to pre-season training for Gálvez, as he was mostly used as a backup for Assani Lukimya at the beginning of the 2015–16 campaign.

Eibar
On 3 August 2016, Gálvez agreed to a three-year deal with SD Eibar in the Spanish top division. Mostly a backup option in his early spell, he was loaned to fellow league club UD Las Palmas on 29 December 2017.

Gálvez terminated his contract on 30 August 2018.

Return to Rayo
On 31 August 2018, one day after becoming a free agent, Gálvez returned to former club Rayo Vallecano after agreeing to a one-year contract. He started in all his league appearances, scoring in a 2–1 away defeat to Girona FC in an eventual relegation as last.

Ibiza
On 22 July 2021, after two years abroad with Qatar SC, Gálvez signed for two seasons with second-tier newcomers UD Ibiza. He missed the first months of his first due to a meniscus injury, and was sent off twice shortly after returning.

Career statistics

References

External links

1989 births
Living people
Spanish footballers
Footballers from Granada
Association football defenders
Association football midfielders
Association football utility players
La Liga players
Segunda División players
Segunda División B players
Tercera División players
Villarreal CF C players
CF Villanovense players
Sporting de Gijón B players
Sporting de Gijón players
Rayo Vallecano players
SD Eibar footballers
UD Las Palmas players
UD Ibiza players
Bundesliga players
SV Werder Bremen players
Qatar Stars League players
Qatar SC players
Spanish expatriate footballers
Expatriate footballers in Germany
Expatriate footballers in Qatar
Spanish expatriate sportspeople in Germany
Spanish expatriate sportspeople in Qatar